The Coalition of Progressive Electors (COPE) swept the 2002 Vancouver municipal election, winning 8 of 10 Council seats, 7 of 9 School Board seats and 5 of 7 Park Board seats. The Non-Partisan Association (NPA) was reduced to 2 Council seats, 1 School Board seat and 2 Park Board seats. The Green Party of Vancouver won 1 School Board seat.

In the race for mayor, the COPE's Larry Campbell defeated Jennifer Clarke of the NPA by a margin of 58% to 30%.

Candidates and results

Mayor 
16 candidates sought election to the position of mayor. Five were affiliated with a political party and 11 were independent. COPE candidate Larry Campbell was elected.

Councillors 
Ten councillors were elected from 46 candidates. Of those, 35 were affiliated with a political party and 11 were independent. Eight COPE councillors and two NPA councillors were elected.

Park Commissioners 
Seven Park Board commissioners were elected from 33 candidates. Of the candidates, 20 were affiliated with a political party and 13 were independent. 5 COPE commissioners and 2 NPA commissioners were elected.

School trustees 
Nine school trustees were elected to the Vancouver Board of Education from 23 candidates. Of the candidates, 18 were affiliated with a political party and five were independent. Five COPE trustees, one NPA trustee, and one Green trustee were elected.

References 
 Municipal Election Results - City of Vancouver Open Data Catalogue
 PDF of General Candidate Results 
 Final List of Candidates 
 Results as Listed Incomplete, Official Office Holders, Pre-Sworn In. 
 Vancouver Charter 
 City Clerk's Election 2002 Archive 

Municipal elections in Vancouver
2002 elections in Canada
2002 in British Columbia